Raj Kumar Gupta is an Indian film writer and director, known for his work in Hindi cinema. He made his directorial debut with the critically acclaimed Aamir (2008). He then went on to write and direct No One Killed Jessica (2011), based on the true story of the murder of Jessica Lal which received both commercial and critical acclaim followed by quirky comedy Ghanchakkar that started Vidya Balan and Emraan Hashmi. In 2018 he directed Raid starring Ajay Devgn which crossed 100 crores.

Filmography

Films

References

External links
 

Film directors from Jharkhand
Hindi-language film directors
Living people
Indian male screenwriters
People from Hazaribagh
Screenwriters from Jharkhand
21st-century Indian film directors
Hindi screenwriters
Year of birth missing (living people)